Odonto–tricho-ungual–digital–palmar syndrome is an autosomal dominant skin condition with salient clinical features of natal teeth, trichodystrophy, prominent interdigital folds, simian-like hands with transverse palmar creases, and ungual digital dystrophy.

See also 
 Skin lesion

References

External links 

Genodermatoses
Genetic disorders with OMIM but no gene
Syndromes